Forshaga Municipality (Forshaga kommun) is a municipality in Värmland County in west central Sweden. Its seat is located in the town of Forshaga.

The first municipality named Forshaga was a market town (köping) which was detached from Grava in 1944. The local government reform of the 1970s made Forshaga a unitary municipality in 1971 and in 1974 Ullerud was added to it.

Forshaga was known in the 14th century as a location for salmon fishing in the river Klarälven. Salmon was used both locally and transported to monasteries in southern Sweden. Forshaga is still known for its rich fishing waters, which attract hobby sport fishers from all over the country.

Localities
Forshaga (seat)
Deje

References

External links

Forshaga Municipality - Official site

Municipalities of Värmland County